Castelo Viegas is a former civil parish in the municipality of Coimbra, Portugal. The population in 2011 was 1,695, in an area of 7.11 km2. On 28 January 2013 it merged with Santa Clara to form Santa Clara e Castelo Viegas.

The first mention is in 1122 with the name Castel Venegas.

References 

Former parishes of Coimbra